Paolo Montalban (born May 21, 1973) is a Filipino-American actor and singer best known for his performance in the 1997 Disney television film, Rodgers & Hammerstein's Cinderella as Prince Christopher, opposite Brandy as Cinderella. He reprised that role in a stage version of the musical with Deborah Gibson and then Jamie-Lynn Sigler as Cinderella and Eartha Kitt as the Fairy Godmother.

Early life
Montalban was born in Manila, Philippines to Paul and Vivian Montalban. His family immigrated to the United States when he was a year old and lived in a studio apartment in Manhattan's West Side across the street from The Juilliard School and Lincoln Center for the Performing Arts. He is an alumnus of St. Peter's Preparatory School and holds a degree in pre-med psychology from Rutgers University.

Career
In 1997, Montalban starred in Cinderella as Prince Christopher alongside Whitney Houston, Whoopi Goldberg and Brandy. He also played Kung Lao in the syndicated series Mortal Kombat: Conquest along with Daniel Bernhardt and Kristanna Loken.

Montalban was also cast in John Dahl's The Great Raid as Sgt. Valera, and the independent film American Adobo, as Raul. He also appeared in Just Wright starring Queen Latifah, The Adjustment Bureau, and the short film Two Weeks.

Montalban was named one of People's 50 Most Beautiful People of 1998.

He has appeared on Broadway in Pacific Overtures, The King and I and Breakfast at Tiffany's, starring Emilia Clarke.  Off-Broadway he was in Two Gentlemen of Verona at Shakespeare in the Park, The Romance of Magno Rubio at Ma Yi Theater Company, among others. He also guest starred in Law & Order: Special Victims Unit (Season 8, Episode 20: "Annihilated") and One Life to Live.

Montalban has appeared in productions of The King and I on Broadway and around the country, where he has played both Lun Tha, the young lover, and the title role of the King. In 2022, Montalban starred as Captain Von Trapp in the Dallas Theater Center production of The Sound of Music at the Dee and Charles Wyly Theatre.

Filmography

Film

Television

External links
Official website

American Adobo official website

See also
 Filipinos in the New York metropolitan area

References

1973 births
Living people
American male film actors
American male actors of Filipino descent
Male actors from Manila
American male musical theatre actors
American male television actors
Rutgers University alumni
St. Peter's Preparatory School alumni
20th-century American male actors
20th-century American male singers
20th-century American singers
21st-century American male actors
21st-century American male singers
21st-century American singers